Beckenham Town Football Club is a football club based in Beckenham, London, England.

History
The original Beckenham Town were established in the late 19th century, affiliating to the Kent County Football Association in 1887. In 1923 the club joined Division One of the London League. They won Division One in 1927–28, and were promoted to the Premier Division. However, after finishing second-from-bottom in their first season in the Premier Division, they ended the 1929–30 season in last place, and were relegated back to Division One.

The following season saw them finish second in Division One, earning promotion back to the Premier Division. Despite finishing bottom of the Premier Division in 1931–32 they remained in the division, but after repeating the feat in 1932–33, they were relegated back to Division One. After finishing bottom of Division One in 1934–35 the club left the league. They had also entered a team into the Kent County Amateur League a few seasons before, and continued playing in the Premier Division of the Western Section until rejoining the London League in 1951, where they were placed in the Premier Division.

They remained in the London League's Premier Division until joining the Aetolian League in 1961. This merged with the London League in 1964 to form the Greater London League, with Beckenham placed in Section B. A fifth-place finish in the league's inaugural season saw them win a place in the Premier Division for the 1965–66 season. However, after finishing second-from-bottom of the division that season, they were relegated to Division One. They folded in 1969.

In 1971 the club was reformed based on the Stanhope Rovers junior team. After playing in the South East London Amateur League, they joined Division Two of the new London Spartan League in 1975. After being runners-up in 1977–78, they were promoted to the Premier Division. In 1982 they transferred to Division One of the Kent League, which became the Premier Division in 1998. They finished as runners–up in 2005–06. The league was subsequently renamed the Southern Counties East League in 2013. The club won both the Kent Senior Trophy and the League Cup in 2013–14, and went on to win the Roy Vinter Shield at the start of the 2014–15 season. In 2019–20 the club were top of the league when the season was abandoned due to the COVID-19 pandemic; this would have been the club's highest finish since reforming in 1971. At the end of the 2020–21 season they were transferred to the Premier Division South of the Combined Counties League. During their first season in the Combined Counties League, Beckenham were Premier Division South champions, earning promotion to the Isthmian League.

Seasons-by-season

Ground
The club played at Stanhope Grove until July 1980 when they moved to Eden Park Avenue. The ground has a capacity of 4,000, of which 120 is seated and covered.

Honours
London League
Division One champions 1927–28
Combined Counties League
Premier Division South champions 2021–22
Southern Counties East League
Challenge Cup winners 2013–14
Roy Vinter Shield winners 2014–15
Kent Senior Trophy
Winners 2013–14

Records
Best FA Cup performance: Fourth qualifying round, 2022–23
Best FA Vase performance: Fourth round, 1980–81
Record attendance: 1,661 vs Dagenham & Redbridge, FA Cup fourth qualifying round, 15 October 2022
Most appearances: Lee Fabian, 985
Most goals: Ricky Bennett

See also
Beckenham Town F.C. players
Beckenham Town F.C. managers

References

External links
Official website

 
Football clubs in Kent
Football clubs in England
Association football clubs established in 1971
1971 establishments in England
Sport in the London Borough of Bromley
London League (football)
Greater London League
Aetolian League (football)
Spartan League
Southern Counties East Football League
Combined Counties Football League